Sandown Park is a horse racing course and leisure venue in Esher, Surrey, England, located in the outer suburbs of London. It hosts 5 Grade One National Hunt races and one Group 1 flat race, the Eclipse Stakes. It regularly has horse racing during afternoons, evenings and on weekends, and also hosts many non racing events such as trade shows, wedding fairs, toy fairs, car shows and auctions, property shows, concerts, and even some private events. It was requisitioned by the War Department from 1940-1945 for World War II. The venue has hosted bands such as UB40, Madness, Girls Aloud, Spandau Ballet and Simply Red. The racecourse is close to Esher railway station served by trains from London Waterloo. There is a secondary exit from Esher station which is open on race days, this exit leads directly into the racecourse and Lower Green, Esher.

History

Sandown Park was one of the first courses to charge all for attending. It opened in 1875 and everyone had to pay at least half a crown. The first meeting was over three days, starting on Thursday 22 April, and included the Grand National Hunt Chase, now staged at the Cheltenham Festival. The Grand International Steeple Chase took place on the Saturday, worth £2,130 to the winner, and was the largest prize for a steeplechase that season, unusually even eclipsing that for the Liverpool Grand National.

In 1875, Sandown became the first course in England to have a members' enclosure.

Notable races

References

External links

Course guide on GG.COM
Course guide on At The Races

 
Sports venues in Surrey
Horse racing venues in England
1875 establishments in England
Sports venues completed in 1875